Events from the year 1974 in Jordan.

Incumbents
Monarch: Hussein 
Prime Minister: Ahmad al-Lawzi (until 26 May), Zaid al-Rifai (starting 26 May)

Births

 May 3 - Princess Haya bint Al Hussein.

See also

 Years in Iraq
 Years in Syria
 Years in Saudi Arabia

References

 
1970s in Jordan
Jordan
Years of the 20th century in Jordan